The 1982 NBA draft took place on June 29, 1982, at the Felt Forum at Madison Square Garden in New York City, New York.  Brent Musburger reported for CBS in the days leading up to the draft that the Los Angeles Lakers and New York Knicks were working on a wider-ranging deal that would have sent Kareem Abdul-Jabbar to New York, Bill Cartwright to the Utah Jazz, and either the #1 or #2 pick from Utah to Los Angeles (which was guaranteed one of those picks anyway due to a 1980 trade with Cleveland), with the Lakers then planning to select both Ralph Sampson and James Worthy. When Sampson decided to forgo entering the draft and to return for another season at the University of Virginia, the deal fell apart and the Lakers picked Worthy with the #1 overall choice.

Draft

Notable post-second round picks

These post-second round picks have appeared in at least one regular or postseason game in the NBA.

Early entrants

College underclassmen
The following college basketball players successfully applied for early draft entrance.

  John Bagley – G, Boston College (junior)
  Terry Cummings – F, DePaul (junior)
  Quintin Dailey – G, San Francisco (junior)
  Ollie Johnson – F, Washington State (junior)
  Clark Kellogg – F, Ohio State (junior)
  Cliff Levingston – F, Wichita State (junior)
  Michael McDuffen – G, Murray State (junior)
  LaSalle Thompson – F/C, Texas (junior)
  Dominique Wilkins – F, Georgia (junior)
  Rob Williams – G, Houston (junior)
  James Worthy – F, North Carolina (junior)
  Victor Mitchell – C, Kansas (junior)

See also
 List of first overall NBA draft picks

References
General

Specific

External links
NBA.com
NBA.com: NBA Draft History

Draft
National Basketball Association draft
NBA draft
NBA draft
1980s in Manhattan
Basketball in New York City
Sporting events in New York City
Sports in Manhattan
Madison Square Garden